This is a list of the bird species recorded in Myanmar. The avifauna of Myanmar include a total of 1151 species, of which 7 are endemic, and two have been introduced by humans. 68 species are globally threatened.

This list's taxonomic treatment (designation and sequence of orders, families and species) and nomenclature (common and scientific names) follow the conventions of The Clements Checklist of Birds of the World, 2022 edition. The family accounts at the beginning of each heading reflect this taxonomy, as do the species counts found in each family account. Introduced and accidental species are included in the total counts for Myanmar.

The following tags have been used to highlight several categories. The commonly occurring native species do not fall into any of these categories.

(A) Accidental - a species that rarely or accidentally occurs in Myanmar
(E) Endemic - a species endemic to Myanmar
(I) Introduced - a species introduced to Myanmar as a consequence, direct or indirect, of human actions
(Ex) Extirpated - a species that no longer occurs in Myanmar although populations exist elsewhere

Ducks, geese, and waterfowl
Order: AnseriformesFamily: Anatidae

Anatidae includes the ducks and most duck-like waterfowl, such as geese and swans. These birds are adapted to an aquatic existence with webbed feet, flattened bills, and feathers that are excellent at shedding water due to an oily coating.

Fulvous whistling-duck, Dendrocygna bicolor
Lesser whistling-duck, Dendrocygna javanica
Bar-headed goose, Anser indicus
Graylag goose, Anser anser
Greater white-fronted goose, Anser albifrons
Taiga bean-goose, Anser fabalis (A)
Tundra bean-goose, Anser serrirostris (A)
Knob-billed duck, Sarkidiornis melanotos
Ruddy shelduck, Tadorna ferruginea
Common shelduck, Tadorna tadorna
Cotton pygmy-goose, Nettapus coromandelianus
Mandarin duck, Aix galericulata (A)
Baikal teal, Sibirionetta formosa
Garganey, Spatula querquedula
Northern shoveler, Spatula clypeata
Gadwall, Mareca strepera
Falcated duck, Mareca falcata
Eurasian wigeon, Mareca penelope
Indian spot-billed duck, Anas poecilorhyncha
Eastern spot-billed duck, Anas zonorhyncha
Mallard, Anas platyrhynchos
Northern pintail, Anas acuta
Green-winged teal, Anas crecca
Pink-headed duck, Rhodonessa caryophyllacea (Ex?)
White-winged duck, Asarcornis scutulata
Red-crested pochard, Netta rufina
Common pochard, Aythya ferina
Ferruginous duck, Aythya nyroca
Baer's pochard, Aythya baeri
Tufted duck, Aythya fuligula
Greater scaup, Aythya marila
Common goldeneye, Bucephala clangula
Smew, Mergellus albellus
Common merganser, Mergus merganser
Red-breasted merganser, Mergus serrator
Scaly-sided merganser, Mergus squamatus

Megapodes
Order: GalliformesFamily: Megapodiidae

The Megapodiidae are stocky, medium-large chicken-like birds with small heads and large feet. All but the malleefowl occupy jungle habitats and most have brown or black colouring. 

Tabon scrubfowl, Megapodius cumingii

Pheasants, grouse, and allies
Order: GalliformesFamily: Phasianidae

The Phasianidae are a family of terrestrial birds. In general, they are plump (although they vary in size) and have broad, relatively short wings.

Ferruginous partridge, Caloperdix oculeus
Crested partridge, Rollulus rouloul
Hill partridge, Arborophila torqueola
Rufous-throated partridge, Arborophila rufogularis
White-cheeked partridge, Arborophila atrogularis
Bar-backed partridge, Arborophila brunneopectus
Scaly-breasted partridge, Tropicoperdix chloropus
Chestnut-necklaced partridge, Tropicoperdix charltonii
Long-billed partridge, Rhizothera longirostris
Great argus, Argusianus argus
Green peafowl, Pavo muticus
Malayan peacock-pheasant, Polyplectron malacense
Gray peacock-pheasant, Polyplectron bicalcaratum
Blue-breasted quail, Synoicus chinensis
Japanese quail, Coturnix japonica
Common quail, Coturnix coturnix
Rain quail, Coturnix coromandelica
Chinese francolin, Francolinus pintadeanus
Mountain bamboo-partridge, Bambusicola fytchii
Red junglefowl, Gallus gallus
Blood pheasant, Ithaginis cruentus
Himalayan monal, Lophophorus impejanus
Sclater's monal, Lophophorus sclateri
Snow partridge, Lerwa lerwa (A)
Blyth's tragopan, Tragopan blythii
Temminck's tragopan, Tragopan temminckii
Hume's pheasant, Syrmaticus humiae
Lady Amherst's pheasant, Chrysolophus amherstiae
Ring-necked pheasant, Phasianus colchicus
Silver pheasant, Lophura nycthemera
Kalij pheasant, Lophura leucomelanos
Siamese fireback, Lophura diardi
Malayan crestless fireback, Lophura erythrophthalma
Malayan crested fireback, Lophura rufa

Grebes
Order: PodicipediformesFamily: Podicipedidae

Grebes are small to medium-large freshwater diving birds. They have lobed toes and are excellent swimmers and divers. However, they have their feet placed far back on the body, making them quite ungainly on land.

Little grebe, Tachybaptus ruficollis
Great crested grebe, Podiceps cristatus
Eared grebe, Podiceps nigricollis

Pigeons and doves
Order: ColumbiformesFamily: Columbidae

Pigeons and doves are stout-bodied birds with short necks and short slender bills with a fleshy cere.

Rock pigeon, Columba livia
Snow pigeon, Columba leuconota
Speckled wood-pigeon, Columba hodgsonii
Ashy wood-pigeon, Columba pulchricollis
Pale-capped pigeon, Columba punicea
Oriental turtle-dove, Streptopelia orientalis
Eurasian collared-dove, Streptopelia decaocto
Burmese collared-dove, Streptopelia xanthocycla
Red collared-dove, Streptopelia tranquebarica
Spotted dove, Spilopelia chinensis
Barred cuckoo-dove, Macropygia unchall
Little cuckoo-dove, Macropygia ruficeps
Asian emerald dove, Chalcophaps indica
Zebra dove, Geopelia striata
Nicobar pigeon, Caloenas nicobarica
Pink-necked green-pigeon, Treron vernans
Cinnamon-headed green-pigeon, Treron fulvicollis
Orange-breasted green-pigeon, Treron bicincta
Andaman green-pigeon, Treron chloropterus
Ashy-headed green-pigeon, Treron phayrei
Thick-billed green-pigeon, Treron curvirostra
Large green-pigeon, Treron capellei
Yellow-footed green-pigeon, Treron phoenicoptera
Pin-tailed green-pigeon, Treron apicauda
Wedge-tailed green-pigeon, Treron sphenura
Green imperial-pigeon, Ducula aenea
Mountain imperial-pigeon, Ducula badia
Pied imperial-pigeon, Ducula bicolor

Cuckoos
Order: CuculiformesFamily: Cuculidae

The family Cuculidae includes cuckoos, roadrunners and anis. These birds are of variable size with slender bodies, long tails and strong legs.

Andaman coucal, Centropus andamanensis
Greater coucal, Centropus sinensis
Lesser coucal, Centropus bengalensis
Raffles's malkoha, Rhinortha chlorophaea
Red-billed malkoha, Zanclostomus javanicus
Chestnut-breasted malkoha, Phaenicophaeus curvirostris
Chestnut-bellied malkoha, Phaenicophaeus sumatranus
Black-bellied malkoha, Phaenicophaeus diardi
Green-billed malkoha, Phaenicophaeus tristis
Chestnut-winged cuckoo, Clamator coromandus
Pied cuckoo, Clamator jacobinus
Asian koel, Eudynamys scolopaceus
Asian emerald cuckoo, Chrysococcyx maculatus
Violet cuckoo, Chrysococcyx xanthorhynchus
Banded bay cuckoo, Cacomantis sonneratii
Plaintive cuckoo, Cacomantis merulinus
Fork-tailed drongo-cuckoo, Surniculus dicruroides
Square-tailed drongo-cuckoo, Surniculus lugubris
Moustached hawk-cuckoo, Hierococcyx vagans
Large hawk-cuckoo, Hierococcyx sparverioides
Common hawk-cuckoo, Hierococcyx varius
Northern hawk-cuckoo, Hierococcyx hyperythrus
Hodgson's hawk-cuckoo, Hierococcyx nisicolor
Lesser cuckoo, Cuculus poliocephalus
Indian cuckoo, Cuculus micropterus
Himalayan cuckoo, Cuculus saturatus
Common cuckoo, Cuculus canorus
Oriental cuckoo, Cuculus optatus

Frogmouths
Order: CaprimulgiformesFamily: Podargidae

The frogmouths are a group of nocturnal birds related to the nightjars. They are named for their large flattened hooked bill and huge frog-like gape, which they use to take insects. 

Hodgson's frogmouth, Batrachostomus hodgsoni
Blyth's frogmouth, Batrachostomus affinis

Nightjars
Order: CaprimulgiformesFamily: Caprimulgidae

Nightjars are medium-sized nocturnal birds that usually nest on the ground. They have long wings, short legs and very short bills. Most have small feet, of little use for walking, and long pointed wings. Their soft plumage is camouflaged to resemble bark or leaves.

Great eared-nightjar, Lyncornis macrotis
Gray nightjar, Caprimulgus jotaka
Large-tailed nightjar, Caprimulgus macrurus
Indian nightjar, Caprimulgus asiaticus
Savanna nightjar, Caprimulgus affinis

Swifts
Order: CaprimulgiformesFamily: Apodidae

Swifts are small birds which spend the majority of their lives flying. These birds have very short legs and never settle voluntarily on the ground, perching instead only on vertical surfaces. Many swifts have long swept-back wings which resemble a crescent or boomerang. 

White-rumped needletail, Zoonavena sylvatica
Silver-rumped needletail, Rhaphidura leucopygialis
White-throated needletail, Hirundapus caudacutus
Silver-backed needletail, Hirundapus cochinchinensis
Brown-backed needletail, Hirundapus giganteus
Plume-toed swiftlet, Collocalia affinis
Himalayan swiftlet, Aerodramus brevirostris
Black-nest swiftlet, Aerodramus maximus
White-nest swiftlet, Aerodramus fuciphagus
Germain's swiftlet, Aerodramus germaniPacific swift, Apus pacificus
Cook's swift, Apus cooki
Dark-rumped swift, Apus acuticauda (A)
House swift, Apus nipalensis
Asian palm-swift, Cypsiurus balasiensis

TreeswiftsOrder: CaprimulgiformesFamily: Hemiprocnidae

The treeswifts, also called crested swifts, are closely related to the true swifts. They differ from the other swifts in that they have crests, long forked tails and softer plumage. 

Crested treeswift, Hemiprocne coronata
Gray-rumped treeswift, Hemiprocne longipennis
Whiskered treeswift, Hemiprocne comata

Rails, gallinules and cootsOrder: GruiformesFamily: Rallidae

Rallidae is a large family of small to medium-sized birds which includes the rails, crakes, coots and gallinules. Typically they inhabit dense vegetation in damp environments near lakes, swamps or rivers. In general they are shy and secretive birds, making them difficult to observe. Most species have strong legs and long toes which are well adapted to soft uneven surfaces. They tend to have short, rounded wings and to be weak fliers.

Brown-cheeked rail, Rallus indicus
Slaty-breasted rail, Lewinia striata
Spotted crake, Porzana porzana (A)
Eurasian moorhen, Gallinula chloropus
Eurasian coot, Fulica atra
Gray-headed swamphen, Porphyrio poliocephalus
Watercock, Gallicrex cinerea
White-breasted waterhen, Amaurornis phoenicurus
White-browed crake, Poliolimnas cinereus (A)
Red-legged crake, Rallina fasciata
Slaty-legged crake, Rallina eurizonoides
Ruddy-breasted crake, Zapornia fusca
Brown crake, Zapornia akool
Baillon's crake, Zapornia pusilla
Black-tailed crake, Zapornia bicolor

FinfootsOrder: GruiformesFamily: Heliornithidae

Heliornithidae is a small family of tropical birds with webbed lobes on their feet similar to those of grebes and coots.

Masked finfoot, Heliopais personatus

CranesOrder: GruiformesFamily: Gruidae

Cranes are large, long-legged and long-necked birds. Unlike the similar-looking but unrelated herons, cranes fly with necks outstretched, not pulled back. Most have elaborate and noisy courting displays or "dances". 

Demoiselle crane, Anthropoides virgo
Sarus crane, Antigone antigone
Common crane, Grus grus
Black-necked crane, Grus nigricollis

Thick-kneesOrder: CharadriiformesFamily: Burhinidae

The thick-knees are a group of largely tropical waders in the family Burhinidae. They are found worldwide within the tropical zone, with some species also breeding in temperate Europe and Australia. They are medium to large waders with strong black or yellow-black bills, large yellow eyes and cryptic plumage. Despite being classed as waders, most species have a preference for arid or semi-arid habitats.

Indian thick-knee, Burhinus indicus
Great thick-knee, Esacus recurvirostris
Beach thick-knee, Esacus magnirostris

Stilts and avocetsOrder: CharadriiformesFamily: Recurvirostridae

Recurvirostridae is a family of large wading birds, which includes the avocets and stilts. The avocets have long legs and long up-curved bills. The stilts have extremely long legs and long, thin, straight bills. 

Black-winged stilt, Himantopus himantopus
Pied stilt, Himantopus leucocephalus (A)
Pied avocet, Recurvirostra avosetta

IbisbillOrder: CharadriiformesFamily: Ibidorhynchidae

The ibisbill is related to the waders, but is sufficiently distinctive to be a family unto itself. The adult is grey with a white belly, red legs, a long down curved bill, and a black face and breast band.

Ibisbill, Ibidorhyncha struthersii

OystercatchersOrder: CharadriiformesFamily: Haematopodidae

The oystercatchers are large and noisy plover-like birds, with strong bills used for smashing or prising open molluscs. 

Eurasian oystercatcher, Haematopus ostralegus

Plovers and lapwingsOrder: CharadriiformesFamily: Charadriidae

The family Charadriidae includes the plovers, dotterels and lapwings. They are small to medium-sized birds with compact bodies, short, thick necks and long, usually pointed, wings. They are found in open country worldwide, mostly in habitats near water. 

Black-bellied plover, Pluvialis squatarola
Pacific golden plover, Pluvialis fulva
Northern lapwing, Vanellus vanellus
River lapwing, Vanellus duvaucelii
Gray-headed lapwing, Vanellus cinereus
Red-wattled lapwing, Vanellus indicus
White-tailed lapwing, Vanellus leucurus
Lesser sand-plover, Charadrius mongolus
Greater sand-plover, Charadrius leschenaultii
Malaysian plover, Charadrius peronii (A)
Kentish plover, Charadrius alexandrinus
White-faced plover, Charadrius dealbatus
Common ringed plover, Charadrius hiaticula
Long-billed plover, Charadrius placidus
Little ringed plover, Charadrius dubius

Painted-snipesOrder: CharadriiformesFamily: Rostratulidae

Painted-snipes are short-legged, long-billed birds similar in shape to the true snipes, but more brightly coloured.

Greater painted-snipe, Rostratula benghalensis

JacanasOrder: CharadriiformesFamily: Jacanidae

The jacanas are a group of tropical waders in the family Jacanidae. They are found throughout the tropics. They are identifiable by their huge feet and claws which enable them to walk on floating vegetation in the shallow lakes that are their preferred habitat. 

Pheasant-tailed jacana, Hydrophasianus chirurgus
Bronze-winged jacana, Metopidius indicus

Sandpipers and alliesOrder: CharadriiformesFamily''': Scolopacidae

Scolopacidae is a large diverse family of small to medium-sized shorebirds including the sandpipers, curlews, godwits, shanks, tattlers, woodcocks, snipes, dowitchers and phalaropes. The majority of these species eat small invertebrates picked out of the mud or soil. Variation in length of legs and bills enables multiple species to feed in the same habitat, particularly on the coast, without direct competition for food.

Whimbrel, Numenius phaeopusLittle curlew, Numenius minutus (A)
Eurasian curlew, Numenius arquataBar-tailed godwit, Limosa lapponicaBlack-tailed godwit, Limosa limosaRuddy turnstone, Arenaria interpresGreat knot, Calidris tenuirostrisRed knot, Calidris canutusRuff, Calidris pugnaxBroad-billed sandpiper, Calidris falcinellusSharp-tailed sandpiper, Calidris acuminataCurlew sandpiper, Calidris ferrugineaTemminck's stint, Calidris temminckiiLong-toed stint, Calidris subminutaSpoon-billed sandpiper, Calidris pygmeusRed-necked stint, Calidris ruficollisSanderling, Calidris albaDunlin, Calidris alpina (A)
Little stint, Calidris minutaAsian dowitcher, Limnodromus semipalmatusJack snipe, Lymnocryptes minimusEurasian woodcock, Scolopax rusticolaSolitary snipe, Gallinago solitariaWood snipe, Gallinago nemoricolaGreat snipe, Gallinago mediaCommon snipe, Gallinago gallinagoPin-tailed snipe, Gallinago stenuraSwinhoe's snipe, Gallinago megalaTerek sandpiper, Xenus cinereusRed-necked phalarope, Phalaropus lobatusCommon sandpiper, Actitis hypoleucosGreen sandpiper, Tringa ochropusGray-tailed tattler, Tringa brevipesSpotted redshank, Tringa erythropus
Common greenshank, Tringa nebularia
Nordmann's greenshank, Tringa guttifer
Marsh sandpiper, Tringa stagnatilis
Wood sandpiper, Tringa glareola
Common redshank, Tringa totanus

ButtonquailOrder: CharadriiformesFamily: Turnicidae

The buttonquail are small, drab, running birds which resemble the true quails. The female is the brighter of the sexes and initiates courtship. The male incubates the eggs and tends the young.

Small buttonquail, Turnix sylvatica
Yellow-legged buttonquail, Turnix tanki
Barred buttonquail, Turnix suscitator

Crab-ploverOrder: CharadriiformesFamily: Dromadidae

The crab-plover is related to the waders. It resembles a plover but with very long grey legs and a strong heavy black bill similar to a tern. It has black-and-white plumage, a long neck, partially webbed feet and a bill designed for eating crabs.

Crab plover, Dromas ardeola (A)

Pratincoles and coursersOrder: CharadriiformesFamily: Glareolidae

Glareolidae is a family of wading birds comprising the pratincoles, which have short legs, long pointed wings and long forked tails, and the coursers, which have long legs, short wings and long, pointed bills which curve downwards. 

Oriental pratincole, Glareola maldivarum
Small pratincole, Glareola lactea

Skuas and jaegersOrder: CharadriiformesFamily: Stercorariidae

The family Stercorariidae are, in general, medium to large birds, typically with grey or brown plumage, often with white markings on the wings. They nest on the ground in temperate and arctic regions and are long-distance migrants.

South polar skua, Stercorarius maccormicki (A)
Pomarine jaeger, Stercorarius pomarinus
Parasitic jaeger, Stercorarius parasiticus

Gulls, terns, and skimmersOrder: CharadriiformesFamily: Laridae

Laridae is a family of medium to large seabirds, the gulls, terns, and skimmers. Gulls are typically grey or white, often with black markings on the head or wings. They have stout, longish bills and webbed feet. Terns are a group of generally medium to large seabirds typically with grey or white plumage, often with black markings on the head. Most terns hunt fish by diving but some pick insects off the surface of fresh water. Terns are generally long-lived birds, with several species known to live in excess of 30 years. Skimmers are a small family of tropical tern-like birds. They have an elongated lower mandible which they use to feed by flying low over the water surface and skimming the water for small fish.

Black-legged kittiwake, Rissa tridactyla (A)
Slender-billed gull, Chroicocephalus genei (A)
Black-headed gull, Chroicocephalus ridibundus
Brown-headed gull, Chroicocephalus brunnicephalus
Pallas's gull, Ichthyaetus ichthyaetus
Herring gull, Larus argentatus
Lesser black-backed gull, Larus fuscus
Brown noddy, Anous stolidus
Sooty tern, Onychoprion fuscatus
Bridled tern, Onychoprion anaethetus
Little tern, Sternula albifrons
Gull-billed tern, Gelochelidon nilotica
Caspian tern, Hydroprogne caspia
White-winged tern, Chlidonias leucopterus
Whiskered tern, Chlidonias hybrida
Roseate tern, Sterna dougallii
Black-naped tern, Sterna sumatrana
Common tern, Sterna hirundo
Black-bellied tern, Sterna acuticauda
River tern, Sterna aurantia
Great crested tern, Thalasseus bergii
Lesser crested tern, Thalasseus bengalensis
Indian skimmer, Rynchops albicollis

TropicbirdsOrder: PhaethontiformesFamily: Phaethontidae

Tropicbirds are slender white birds of tropical oceans, with exceptionally long central tail feathers. Their heads and long wings have black markings.

White-tailed tropicbird, Phaethon lepturus (A)
Red-billed tropicbird, Phaethon aethereus

Southern storm-petrelsOrder: ProcellariiformesFamily: Oceanitidae

The southern storm-petrels are relatives of the petrels and are the smallest seabirds. They feed on planktonic crustaceans and small fish picked from the surface, typically while hovering. The flight is fluttering and sometimes bat-like.

Wilson's storm-petrel, Oceanites oceanicus
Black-bellied storm-petrel, Fregetta tropica (A)

Northern storm-petrelsOrder: ProcellariiformesFamily: Hydrobatidae

Though the members of this family are similar in many respects to the southern storm-petrels, including their general appearance and habits, there are enough genetic differences to warrant their placement in a separate family.

Swinhoe's storm-petrel, Hydrobates monorhis

StorksOrder: CiconiiformesFamily: Ciconiidae

Storks are large, long-legged, long-necked, wading birds with long, stout bills. Storks are mute, but bill-clattering is an important mode of communication at the nest. Their nests can be large and may be reused for many years. Many species are migratory.

Asian openbill, Anastomus oscitans
Black stork, Ciconia nigra
Asian woolly-necked stork, Ciconia episcopus
Storm's stork, Ciconia stormi (A)
White stork, Ciconia ciconia
Oriental stork, Ciconia boyciana
Black-necked stork, Ephippiorhynchus asiaticus
Lesser adjutant, Leptoptilos javanicus
Greater adjutant, Leptoptilos dubius
Painted stork, Mycteria leucocephala

FrigatebirdsOrder: SuliformesFamily: Fregatidae

Frigatebirds are large seabirds usually found over tropical oceans. They are large, black-and-white or completely black, with long wings and deeply forked tails. The males have coloured inflatable throat pouches. They do not swim or walk and cannot take off from a flat surface. Having the largest wingspan-to-body-weight ratio of any bird, they are essentially aerial, able to stay aloft for more than a week.

Christmas Island frigatebird, Fregata andrewsi
Great frigatebird, Fregata minor (A)

Boobies and gannetsOrder: SuliformesFamily: Sulidae

The sulids comprise the gannets and boobies. Both groups are medium to large coastal seabirds that plunge-dive for fish.

Brown booby, Sula leucogaster

AnhingasOrder: SuliformesFamily: Anhingidae

Anhingas or darters are often called "snake-birds" because of their long thin neck, which gives a snake-like appearance when they swim with their bodies submerged. The males have black and dark-brown plumage, an erectile crest on the nape and a larger bill than the female. The females have much paler plumage especially on the neck and underparts. The darters have completely webbed feet and their legs are short and set far back on the body. Their plumage is somewhat permeable, like that of cormorants, and they spread their wings to dry after diving.

Oriental darter, Anhinga melanogaster

Cormorants and shagsOrder: SuliformesFamily: Phalacrocoracidae

Phalacrocoracidae is a family of medium to large coastal, fish-eating seabirds that includes cormorants and shags. Plumage colouration varies, with the majority having mainly dark plumage, some species being black-and-white and a few being colourful.

Little cormorant, Microcarbo niger
Great cormorant, Phalacrocorax carbo
Indian cormorant, Phalacrocorax fuscicollis

PelicansOrder: PelecaniformesFamily: Pelecanidae

Pelicans are large water birds with a distinctive pouch under their beak. As with other members of the order Pelecaniformes, they have webbed feet with four toes.

Great white pelican, Pelecanus onocrotalus
Spot-billed pelican, Pelecanus philippensis (A)

Herons, egrets, and bitternsOrder: PelecaniformesFamily: Ardeidae

The family Ardeidae contains the bitterns, herons and egrets. Herons and egrets are medium to large wading birds with long necks and legs. Bitterns tend to be shorter necked and more wary. Members of Ardeidae fly with their necks retracted, unlike other long-necked birds such as storks, ibises and spoonbills.

Great bittern, Botaurus stellaris
Yellow bittern, Ixobrychus sinensis
Schrenck's bittern, Ixobrychus eurhythmus
Cinnamon bittern, Ixobrychus cinnamomeus
Black bittern, Ixobrychus flavicollis
Gray heron, Ardea cinerea
White-bellied heron, Ardea insignis
Great-billed heron, Ardea sumatrana
Purple heron, Ardea purpurea
Great egret, Ardea alba
Intermediate egret, Ardea intermedia
Chinese egret, Ardea eulophotes (A)
Little egret, Egretta garzetta
Pacific reef-heron, Egretta sacra
Cattle egret, Bubulcus ibis
Indian pond-heron, Ardeola grayii
Chinese pond-heron, Ardeola bacchus
Javan pond-heron, Ardeola speciosa
Striated heron, Butorides striata
Black-crowned night-heron, Nycticorax nycticorax
Malayan night-heron, Gorsachius melanolophus

Ibises and spoonbillsOrder: PelecaniformesFamily: Threskiornithidae

Threskiornithidae is a family of large terrestrial and wading birds which includes the ibises and spoonbills. They have long, broad wings with 11 primary and about 20 secondary feathers. They are strong fliers and despite their size and weight, very capable soarers.

Glossy ibis, Plegadis falcinellus
Black-headed ibis, Threskiornis melanocephalus
Red-naped ibis, Pseudibis papillosa
White-shouldered ibis, Pseudibis davisoni (Ex?)
Eurasian spoonbill, Platalea leucorodia

OspreyOrder: AccipitriformesFamily: Pandionidae

The family Pandionidae contains only one species, the osprey. The osprey is a medium-large raptor which is a specialist fish-eater with a worldwide distribution.

Osprey, Pandion haliaetus

Hawks, eagles, and kitesOrder: AccipitriformesFamily: Accipitridae

Accipitridae is a family of birds of prey, which includes hawks, eagles, kites, harriers and Old World vultures. These birds have powerful hooked beaks for tearing flesh from their prey, strong legs, powerful talons and keen eyesight.

Black-winged kite, Elanus caeruleus
Egyptian vulture, Neophron percnopterus
Oriental honey-buzzard, Pernis ptilorhynchus
Jerdon's baza, Aviceda jerdoni
Black baza, Aviceda leuphotes
Red-headed vulture, Sarcogyps calvus
Cinereous vulture, Aegypius monachus (A)
White-rumped vulture, Gyps bengalensis
Slender-billed vulture, Gyps tenuirostris (A)
Himalayan griffon, Gyps himalayensis
Crested serpent-eagle, Spilornis cheela
Short-toed snake-eagle, Circaetus gallicus
Bat hawk, Macheiramphus alcinus
Changeable hawk-eagle, Nisaetus cirrhatus
Mountain hawk-eagle, Nisaetus nipalensis
Blyth's hawk-eagle, Nisaetus alboniger
Wallace's hawk-eagle, Nisaetus nanus
Rufous-bellied eagle, Lophotriorchis kienerii
Black eagle, Ictinaetus malaiensis
Indian spotted eagle, Clanga hastata
Greater spotted eagle, Clanga clanga
Booted eagle, Hieraaetus pennatus
Tawny eagle, Aquila rapax
Steppe eagle, Aquila nipalensis
Imperial eagle, Aquila heliaca
Bonelli's eagle, Aquila fasciata
White-eyed buzzard, Butastur teesa
Rufous-winged buzzard, Butastur liventer
Gray-faced buzzard, Butastur indicus
Eurasian marsh harrier, Circus aeruginosus
Eastern marsh harrier, Circus spilonotus
Hen harrier, Circus cyaneus
Pallid harrier, Circus macrourus
Pied harrier, Circus melanoleucos
Crested goshawk, Accipiter trivirgatus
Shikra, Accipiter badius
Chinese sparrowhawk, Accipiter soloensis
Japanese sparrowhawk, Accipiter gularis
Besra, Accipiter virgatus
Eurasian sparrowhawk, Accipiter nisus
Northern goshawk, Accipiter gentilis
Black kite, Milvus migrans
Brahminy kite, Haliastur indus
White-tailed eagle, Haliaeetus albicilla
Pallas's fish-eagle, Haliaeetus leucoryphus
White-bellied sea-eagle, Haliaeetus leucogaster
Lesser fish-eagle, Haliaeetus humilis
Gray-headed fish-eagle, Haliaeetus ichthyaetus
Common buzzard, Buteo buteo
Himalayan buzzard, Buteo refectus
Eastern buzzard, Buteo japonicus
Long-legged buzzard, Buteo rufinus

Barn-owlsOrder: StrigiformesFamily: Tytonidae

Barn-owls are medium to large owls with large heads and characteristic heart-shaped faces. They have long strong legs with powerful talons.

Australasian grass-owl, Tyto longimembris
Barn owl, Tyto alba
Oriental bay-owl, Phodilus badius

OwlsOrder: StrigiformesFamily: Strigidae

The typical owls are small to large solitary nocturnal birds of prey. They have large forward-facing eyes and ears, a hawk-like beak and a conspicuous circle of feathers around each eye called a facial disk.

White-fronted scops-owl, Otus sagittatus
Mountain scops-owl, Otus spilocephalus
Collared scops-owl, Otus lettia
Sunda scops-owl, Otus lempiji
Oriental scops-owl, Otus sunia
Rock eagle-owl, Bubo bengalensis
Spot-bellied eagle-owl, Bubo nipalensis
Barred eagle-owl, Bubo sumatranus
Dusky eagle-owl, Bubo coromandus
Brown fish-owl, Ketupa zeylonensis
Tawny fish-owl, Ketupa flavipes
Buffy fish-owl, Ketupa ketupu
Collared owlet, Taenioptynx brodiei
Asian barred owlet, Glaucidium cuculoides
Jungle owlet, Glaucidium radiatum
Spotted owlet, Athene brama
Spotted wood-owl, Strix seloputo
Mottled wood-owl, Strix ocellata
Brown wood-owl, Strix leptogrammica
Himalayan owl, Strix nivicolum
Long-eared owl, Asio otus
Short-eared owl, Asio flammeus
Brown boobook, Ninox scutulata

TrogonsOrder: TrogoniformesFamily: Trogonidae

The family Trogonidae includes trogons and quetzals. Found in tropical woodlands worldwide, they feed on insects and fruit, and their broad bills and weak legs reflect their diet and arboreal habits. Although their flight is fast, they are reluctant to fly any distance. Trogons have soft, often colourful, feathers with distinctive male and female plumage. 

Scarlet-rumped trogon, Harpactes duvaucelii
Red-headed trogon, Harpactes erythrocephalus
Orange-breasted trogon, Harpactes oreskios
Ward's trogon, Harpactes wardi

HoopoesOrder: BucerotiformesFamily: Upupidae

Hoopoes have black, white and orangey-pink colouring with a large erectile crest on their head. 

Eurasian hoopoe, Upupa epops

HornbillsOrder: BucerotiformesFamily: Bucerotidae

Hornbills are a group of birds whose bill is shaped like a cow's horn, but without a twist, sometimes with a casque on the upper mandible. Frequently, the bill is brightly coloured.

White-crowned hornbill, Berenicornis comatus
Helmeted hornbill, Buceros vigil
Great hornbill, Buceros bicornis
Bushy-crested hornbill, Anorrhinus galeritus
Brown hornbill, Anorrhinus austeni
Rusty-cheeked hornbill, Anorrhinus tickelli
Black hornbill, Anthracoceros malayanus (A)
Oriental pied-hornbill, Anthracoceros albirostris
Rufous-necked hornbill, Aceros nipalensis
Wreathed hornbill, Rhyticeros undulatus
Plain-pouched hornbill, Rhyticeros subruficollis

KingfishersOrder: CoraciiformesFamily: Alcedinidae

Kingfishers are medium-sized birds with large heads, long, pointed bills, short legs and stubby tails.

Blyth's kingfisher, Alcedo hercules
Common kingfisher, Alcedo atthis
Blue-eared kingfisher, Alcedo meninting
Malaysian blue-banded kingfisher, Alcedo peninsulae
Black-backed dwarf-kingfisher, Ceyx erithacus
Banded kingfisher, Lacedo pulchella
Brown-winged kingfisher, Pelargopsis amauropterus
Stork-billed kingfisher, Pelargopsis capensis
Ruddy kingfisher, Halcyon coromanda
White-throated kingfisher, Halcyon smyrnensis
Black-capped kingfisher, Halcyon pileata
Collared kingfisher, Todirhamphus chloris
Rufous-collared kingfisher, Actenoides concretus
Crested kingfisher, Megaceryle lugubris
Pied kingfisher, Ceryle rudis

Bee-eatersOrder: CoraciiformesFamily: Meropidae

The bee-eaters are a group of near passerine birds in the family Meropidae. Most species are found in Africa but others occur in southern Europe, Madagascar, Australia and New Guinea. They are characterised by richly coloured plumage, slender bodies and usually elongated central tail feathers. All are colourful and have long downturned bills and pointed wings, which give them a swallow-like appearance when seen from afar.

Red-bearded bee-eater, Nyctyornis amictus
Blue-bearded bee-eater, Nyctyornis athertoni
Asian green bee-eater, Merops orientalis
Blue-throated bee-eater, Merops viridis
Blue-tailed bee-eater, Merops philippinus
Chestnut-headed bee-eater, Merops leschenaulti

RollersOrder: CoraciiformesFamily: Coraciidae

Rollers resemble crows in size and build, but are more closely related to the kingfishers and bee-eaters. They share the colourful appearance of those groups with blues and browns predominating. The two inner front toes are connected, but the outer toe is not. 

Indochinese roller, Coracias affinis
Dollarbird, Eurystomus orientalis

Asian barbetsOrder: PiciformesFamily: Megalaimidae

The Asian barbets are plump birds, with short necks and large heads. They get their name from the bristles which fringe their heavy bills. Most species are brightly coloured.

Sooty barbet, Caloramphus hayii
Coppersmith barbet, Psilopogon haemacephalus
Blue-eared barbet, Psilopogon duvaucelii
Great barbet, Psilopogon virens
Red-crowned barbet, Psilopogon rafflesii
Red-throated barbet, Psilopogon mystacophanos
Green-eared barbet, Psilopogon faiostrictus
Lineated barbet, Psilopogon lineatus
Golden-throated barbet, Psilopogon franklinii
Gold-whiskered barbet, Psilopogon chrysopogon
Moustached barbet, Psilopogon incognitus
Blue-throated barbet, Psilopogon asiaticus

HoneyguidesOrder: PiciformesFamily: Indicatoridae

Honeyguides are among the few birds that feed on wax. They are named for the greater honeyguide which leads traditional honey-hunters to bees' nests and, after the hunters have harvested the honey, feeds on the remaining contents of the hive.

Yellow-rumped honeyguide, Indicator xanthonotus

WoodpeckersOrder: PiciformesFamily: Picidae

Woodpeckers are small to medium-sized birds with chisel-like beaks, short legs, stiff tails and long tongues used for capturing insects. Some species have feet with two toes pointing forward and two backward, while several species have only three toes. Many woodpeckers have the habit of tapping noisily on tree trunks with their beaks.

Eurasian wryneck, Jynx torquilla
Speckled piculet, Picumnus innominatus
Rufous piculet, Sasia abnormis
White-browed piculet, Sasia ochracea
Gray-and-buff woodpecker, Hemicircus concretus
Heart-spotted woodpecker, Hemicircus canente
Gray-capped pygmy woodpecker, Yungipicus canicapillus
Yellow-crowned woodpecker, Leiopicus mahrattensis
Rufous-bellied woodpecker, Dendrocopos hyperythrus
Fulvous-breasted woodpecker, Dendrocopos macei
Freckle-breasted woodpecker, Dendrocopos analis
Stripe-breasted woodpecker, Dendrocopos atratus
Darjeeling woodpecker, Dendrocopos darjellensis
Great spotted woodpecker, Dendrocopos major
Crimson-breasted woodpecker, Dryobates cathpharius
Maroon woodpecker, Blythipicus rubiginosus
Bay woodpecker, Blythipicus pyrrhotis
Greater flameback, Chrysocolaptes guttacristatus
Rufous woodpecker, Micropternus brachyurus
Buff-necked woodpecker, Meiglyptes tukki
Buff-rumped woodpecker, Meiglyptes tristis
Black-and-buff woodpecker, Meiglyptes jugularis
Pale-headed woodpecker, Gecinulus grantia
Bamboo woodpecker, Gecinulus viridis
Olive-backed woodpecker, Dinopium rafflesii
Himalayan flameback, Dinopium shorii
Common flameback, Dinopium javanense
Black-rumped flameback, Dinopium benghalense
Lesser yellownape, Picus chlorolophus
Crimson-winged woodpecker, Picus puniceus
Streak-throated woodpecker, Picus xanthopygaeus
Streak-breasted woodpecker, Picus viridanus
Laced woodpecker, Picus vittatus
Gray-headed woodpecker, Picus canus
Black-headed woodpecker, Picus erythropygius
Banded woodpecker, Chrysophlegma mineaceum
Greater yellownape, Chrysophlegma flavinucha
Checker-throated woodpecker, Chrysophlegma mentale
Great slaty woodpecker, Mulleripicus pulverulentus
White-bellied woodpecker, Dryocopus javensis

Falcons and caracarasOrder: FalconiformesFamily: Falconidae

Falconidae is a family of diurnal birds of prey. They differ from hawks, eagles and kites in that they kill with their beaks instead of their talons. 

White-rumped falcon, Polihierax insignis
Collared falconet, Microhierax caerulescens
Black-thighed falconet, Microhierax fringillarius
Pied falconet, Microhierax melanoleucos (A)
Lesser kestrel, Falco naumanni
Eurasian kestrel, Falco tinnunculus
Amur falcon, Falco amurensis
Merlin, Falco columbarius (A)
Eurasian hobby, Falco subbuteo
Oriental hobby, Falco severus
Laggar falcon, Falco jugger
Peregrine falcon, Falco peregrinusOld World parrotsOrder: PsittaciformesFamily: Psittaculidae

Characteristic features of parrots include a strong curved bill, an upright stance, strong legs, and clawed zygodactyl feet. Many parrots are vividly coloured, and some are multi-coloured. Old World parrots are found from Africa east across south and southeast Asia and Oceania to Australia and New Zealand.

Blue-rumped parrot, Psittinus cyanurus
Alexandrine parakeet, Psittacula eupatria
Rose-ringed parakeet, Psittacula krameri
Gray-headed parakeet, Psittacula finschii
Blossom-headed parakeet, Psittacula roseata
Red-breasted parakeet, Psittacula alexandri
Long-tailed parakeet, Psittacula longicauda
Vernal hanging-parrot, Loriculus vernalis

African and green broadbillsOrder: PasseriformesFamily: Calyptomenidae

The African and green broadbills are small, brightly coloured birds, which feed on fruit and also take insects in flycatcher fashion, snapping their broad bills. Their habitat is canopies of wet forests

Green broadbill, Calyptomena viridis

Asian and Grauer's broadbillsOrder: PasseriformesFamily: Eurylaimidae 

Many of the species are brightly coloured birds that present broad heads, large eyes and a hooked, flat and broad beak.

Black-and-red broadbill, Cymbirhynchus macrorhynchos
Long-tailed broadbill, Psarisomus dalhousiae
Silver-breasted broadbill, Serilophus lunatus
Banded broadbill, Eurylaimus javanicus
Black-and-yellow broadbill, Eurylaimus ochromalus
Dusky broadbill, Corydon sumatranus

PittasOrder: PasseriformesFamily: Pittidae

Pittas are medium-sized by passerine standards and are stocky, with fairly long, strong legs, short tails and stout bills. Many are brightly coloured. They spend the majority of their time on wet forest floors, eating snails, insects and similar invertebrates.

Garnet pitta, Erythropitta granatina
Eared pitta, Hydrornis phayrei
Rusty-naped pitta, Hydrornis oatesi
Blue-naped pitta, Hydrornis nipalensis
Giant pitta, Hydrornis caerulea
Blue pitta, Hydrornis cyanea
Gurney's pitta, Hydrornis gurneyi (E)
Indian pitta, Pitta brachyura
Blue-winged pitta, Pitta moluccensis
Fairy pitta, Pitta nympha
Hooded pitta, Pitta sordida
Mangrove pitta, Pitta megarhyncha

Thornbills and alliesOrder: PasseriformesFamily: Acanthizidae

The Acanthizidae are small- to medium-sized birds with short rounded wings, slender bills, long legs, and a short tail. The golden-bellied gerygone is the only member of the family found in mainland Asia.

Golden-bellied gerygone, Gerygone sulphurea (A)

CuckooshrikesOrder: PasseriformesFamily: Campephagidae

The cuckooshrikes are small to medium-sized passerine birds. They are predominantly greyish with white and black, although some species are brightly coloured. 

Jerdon's minivet, Pericrocotus albifrons (E)
Fiery minivet, Pericrocotus igneus
Small minivet, Pericrocotus cinnamomeus
Gray-chinned minivet, Pericrocotus solaris
Short-billed minivet, Pericrocotus brevirostris
Long-tailed minivet, Pericrocotus ethologus
Scarlet minivet, Pericrocotus flammeus
Ashy minivet, Pericrocotus divaricatus
Brown-rumped minivet, Pericrocotus cantonensis
Rosy minivet, Pericrocotus roseus
Large cuckooshrike, Coracina macei
Black-winged cuckooshrike, Lalage melaschistos
Black-headed cuckooshrike, Lalage melanoptera
Lesser cuckooshrike, Lalage fimbriata
Indochinese cuckooshrike, Lalage polioptera

Vireos, shrike-babblers, and erpornisOrder: PasseriformesFamily: Vireonidae

Most of the members of this family are found in the New World. However, the shrike-babblers and erpornis, which only slightly resemble the "true" vireos and greenlets, are found in South East Asia.

Black-headed shrike-babbler, Pteruthius rufiventer
White-browed shrike-babbler, Pteruthius aeralatus
Green shrike-babbler, Pteruthius xanthochlorus
Black-eared shrike-babbler, Pteruthius melanotis
Clicking shrike-babbler, Pteruthius intermedius
White-bellied erpornis, Erpornis zantholeuca

Whistlers and alliesOrder: PasseriformesFamily: Pachycephalidae

The family Pachycephalidae includes the whistlers, shrikethrushes, and some of the pitohuis.

Mangrove whistler, Pachycephala cinerea

Old World oriolesOrder: PasseriformesFamily: Oriolidae

The Old World orioles are colourful passerine birds. They are not related to the New World orioles.

Dark-throated oriole, Oriolus xanthonotus
Black-naped oriole, Oriolus chinensis
Slender-billed oriole, Oriolus tenuirostris
Black-hooded oriole, Oriolus xanthornus
Maroon oriole, Oriolus traillii

Woodswallows, bellmagpies, and allies Order: PasseriformesFamily: Artamidae

The woodswallows are soft-plumaged, somber-coloured passerine birds. They are smooth, agile flyers with moderately large, semi-triangular wings. 

Ashy woodswallow, Artamus fuscus
White-breasted woodswallow, Artamus leucorynchus

Vangas, helmetshrikes, and alliesOrder: PasseriformesFamily: Vangidae

The family Vangidae is highly variable, though most members of it resemble true shrikes to some degree.

Large woodshrike, Tephrodornis gularis
Common woodshrike, Tephrodornis pondicerianus
Bar-winged flycatcher-shrike, Hemipus picatus
Rufous-winged philentoma, Philentoma pyrhopterum
Maroon-breasted philentoma, Philentoma velatum

IorasOrder: PasseriformesFamily: Aegithinidae

The ioras are bulbul-like birds of open forest or thorn scrub, but whereas that group tends to be drab in colouration, ioras are sexually dimorphic, with the males being brightly plumaged in yellows and greens.

Common iora, Aegithina tiphia
Green iora, Aegithina viridissima
Great iora, Aegithina lafresnayei

FantailsOrder: PasseriformesFamily: Rhipiduridae

The fantails are small insectivorous birds which are specialist aerial feeders.

Malaysian pied-fantail, Rhipidura javanica
White-throated fantail, Rhipidura albicollis
White-browed fantail, Rhipidura aureola

DrongosOrder: PasseriformesFamily: Dicruridae

The drongos are mostly black or dark grey in colour, sometimes with metallic tints. They have long forked tails, and some Asian species have elaborate tail decorations. They have short legs and sit very upright when perched, like a shrike. They flycatch or take prey from the ground. 

Black drongo, Dicrurus macrocercus
Ashy drongo, Dicrurus leucophaeus
Crow-billed drongo, Dicrurus annectens
Bronzed drongo, Dicrurus aeneus
Lesser racket-tailed drongo, Dicrurus remifer
Hair-crested drongo, Dicrurus hottentottus
Andaman drongo, Dicrurus andamanensis
Greater racket-tailed drongo, Dicrurus paradiseus

Monarch flycatchersOrder: PasseriformesFamily: Monarchidae

The monarch flycatchers are small to medium-sized insectivorous passerines which hunt by flycatching. 

Black-naped monarch, Hypothymis azurea
Amur paradise-flycatcher, Terpsiphone incei
Blyth's paradise-flycatcher, Terpsiphone affinis
Indian paradise-flycatcher, Terpsiphone paradisi

Crested shrikejayOrder: PasseriformesFamily: Platylophidae

Until 2018 this species was included in family Corvidae, but genetic and morphological evidence place it in its own family.

Crested shrikejay, Platylophus galericulatus

ShrikesOrder: PasseriformesFamily: Laniidae

Shrikes are passerine birds known for their habit of catching other birds and small animals and impaling the uneaten portions of their bodies on thorns. A typical shrike's beak is hooked, like a bird of prey. 

Tiger shrike, Lanius tigrinus
Brown shrike, Lanius cristatus
Burmese shrike, Lanius collurioides
Long-tailed shrike, Lanius schach
Gray-backed shrike, Lanius tephronotus

Crows, jays, and magpiesOrder: PasseriformesFamily: Corvidae

The family Corvidae includes crows, ravens, jays, choughs, magpies, treepies, nutcrackers and ground jays. Corvids are above average in size among the Passeriformes, and some of the larger species show high levels of intelligence.

Black magpie, Platysmurus leucopterus
Eurasian jay, Garrulus glandarius
Yellow-billed blue-magpie, Urocissa flavirostris
Red-billed blue-magpie, Urocissa erythrorhyncha
Common green-magpie, Cissa chinensis
Rufous treepie, Dendrocitta vagabunda
Gray treepie, Dendrocitta formosae
Collared treepie, Dendrocitta frontalis
Racket-tailed treepie, Crypsirina temia
Hooded treepie, Crypsirina cucullata (E)
Ratchet-tailed treepie, Temnurus temnurus
Oriental magpie, Pica serica
Eurasian magpie, Pica pica
Eurasian nutcracker, Nucifraga caryocatactes
House crow, Corvus splendens
Large-billed crow, Corvus macrorhynchos

Fairy flycatchersOrder: PasseriformesFamily: Stenostiridae

Most of the species of this small family are found in Africa, though a few inhabit tropical Asia. They are not closely related to other birds called "flycatchers".

Yellow-bellied fairy-fantail, Chelidorhynx hypoxanthus
Gray-headed canary-flycatcher, Culicicapa ceylonensis

Tits, chickadees, and titmiceOrder: PasseriformesFamily: Paridae

The Paridae are mainly small stocky woodland species with short stout bills. Some have crests. They are adaptable birds, with a mixed diet including seeds and insects.

Fire-capped tit, Cephalopyrus flammiceps
Yellow-browed tit, Sylviparus modestus
Sultan tit, Melanochlora sultanea
Coal tit, Periparus ater
Rufous-vented tit, Periparus rubidiventris
Gray-crested tit, Lophophanes dichrous
Marsh tit, Poecile palustris
Black-bibbed tit, Poecile hypermelaneus
Green-backed tit, Parus monticolus
Cinereous tit, Parus cinereus
Japanese tit, Parus minor
Yellow-cheeked tit, Parus spilonotus

LarksOrder: PasseriformesFamily: Alaudidae

Larks are small terrestrial birds with often extravagant songs and display flights. Most larks are fairly dull in appearance. Their food is insects and seeds.

Horsfield’s bushlark, Mirafra javanica
Burmese bushlark, Mirafra microptera (E)
Bengal bushlark, Mirafra assamica
Indochinese bushlark, Mirafra erythrocephala
Mongolian short-toed lark, Calandrella dukhunensis
Asian short-toed lark, Alaudala cheleensis
Sand lark, Alaudala raytal
Oriental skylark, Alauda gulgula

Cisticolas and alliesOrder: PasseriformesFamily: Cisticolidae

The Cisticolidae are warblers found mainly in warmer southern regions of the Old World. They are generally very small birds of drab brown or grey appearance found in open country such as grassland or scrub.

Common tailorbird, Orthotomus sutorius
Dark-necked tailorbird, Orthotomus atrogularis
Ashy tailorbird, Orthotomus ruficeps
Rufous-tailed tailorbird, Orthotomus sericeus
Himalayan prinia, Prinia crinigera
Burmese prinia, Prinia cooki
Black-throated prinia, Prinia atrogularis
Hill prinia, Prinia superciliaris
Rufescent prinia, Prinia rufescens
Gray-breasted prinia, Prinia hodgsonii
Yellow-bellied prinia, Prinia flaviventris
Plain prinia, Prinia inornata
Zitting cisticola, Cisticola juncidis
Golden-headed cisticola, Cisticola exilis

Reed warblers and alliesOrder: PasseriformesFamily: Acrocephalidae

The members of this family are usually rather large for "warblers". Most are rather plain olivaceous brown above with much yellow to beige below. They are usually found in open woodland, reedbeds, or tall grass. The family occurs mostly in southern to western Eurasia and surroundings, but it also ranges far into the Pacific, with some species in Africa.

Thick-billed warbler, Arundinax aedon
Booted warbler, Iduna caligata (A)
Black-browed reed warbler, Acrocephalus bistrigiceps
Paddyfield warbler, Acrocephalus agricola
Blunt-winged warbler, Acrocephalus concinens
Manchurian reed warbler, Acrocephalus tangorum (A)
Blyth's reed warbler, Acrocephalus dumetorum
Oriental reed warbler, Acrocephalus orientalis
Clamorous reed warbler, Acrocephalus stentoreus

Grassbirds and alliesOrder: PasseriformesFamily: Locustellidae

Locustellidae are a family of small insectivorous songbirds found mainly in Eurasia, Africa, and the Australian region. They are smallish birds with tails that are usually long and pointed, and tend to be drab brownish or buffy all over.

Striated grassbird, Megalurus palustris
Pallas's grasshopper warbler, Helopsaltes certhiola
Lanceolated warbler, Locustella lanceolata
Brown bush warbler, Locustella luteoventris
Chinese bush warbler, Locustella tacsanowskia
Baikal bush warbler, Locustella davidi
Spotted bush warbler, Locustella thoracica
Russet bush warbler, Locustella mandelli
Dalat bush warbler, Locustella idonea

CupwingsOrder: PasseriformesFamily: Pnoepygidae

The members of this small family are found in mountainous parts of South and South East Asia.

Scaly-breasted cupwing, Pnoepyga albiventer
Pygmy cupwing, Pnoepyga pusilla

SwallowsOrder: PasseriformesFamily: Hirundinidae

The family Hirundinidae is adapted to aerial feeding. They have a slender streamlined body, long pointed wings and a short bill with a wide gape. The feet are adapted to perching rather than walking, and the front toes are partially joined at the base.

Gray-throated martin, Riparia chinensis
Bank swallow, Riparia riparia
Dusky crag-martin, Ptyonoprogne concolor
Barn swallow, Hirundo rustica
Wire-tailed swallow, Hirundo smithii
Pacific swallow, Hirundo tahitica
Red-rumped swallow, Cecropis daurica
Striated swallow, Cecropis striolata
Rufous-bellied swallow, Cecropis badia
Common house-martin, Delichon urbica
Asian house-martin, Delichon dasypus
Nepal house-martin, Delichon nipalensis

BulbulsOrder: PasseriformesFamily: Pycnonotidae

Bulbuls are medium-sized songbirds. Some are colourful with yellow, red or orange vents, cheeks, throats or supercilia, but most are drab, with uniform olive-brown to black plumage. Some species have distinct crests.

Puff-backed bulbul, Brachypodius eutilotus
Black-headed bulbul, Brachypodius melanocephalos
Spectacled bulbul, Rubigula erythropthalmos
Gray-bellied bulbul, Rubigula cyaniventris
Scaly-breasted bulbul, Rubigula squamatus
Black-crested bulbul, Rubigula flaviventris
Crested finchbill, Spizixos canifrons
Straw-headed bulbul, Pycnonotus zeylanicus
Striated bulbul, Pycnonotus striatus
Red-vented bulbul, Pycnonotus cafer
Red-whiskered bulbul, Pycnonotus jocosus
Brown-breasted bulbul, Pycnonotus xanthorrhous
Sooty-headed bulbul, Pycnonotus aurigaster
Stripe-throated bulbul, Pycnonotus finlaysoni
Flavescent bulbul, Pycnonotus flavescens
Yellow-vented bulbul, Pycnonotus goiavier
Olive-winged bulbul, Pycnonotus plumosus
Ayeyarwady bulbul, Pycnonotus blanfordi 
Streak-eared bulbul, Pycnonotus conradi
Cream-vented bulbul, Pycnonotus simplex
Red-eyed bulbul, Pycnonotus brunneus
Hairy-backed bulbul, Tricholestes criniger
White-throated bulbul, Alophoixus flaveolus
Puff-throated bulbul, Alophoixus pallidus
Ochraceous bulbul, Alophoixus ochraceus
Gray-cheeked bulbul, Alophoixus tephrogenys
Yellow-bellied bulbul, Alophoixus phaeocephalus
Buff-vented bulbul, Iole olivacea
Gray-eyed bulbul, Iole propinqua
Olive bulbul, Iole virescens
Black bulbul, Hypsipetes leucocephalus
White-headed bulbul, Hypsipetes thompsoni
Ashy bulbul, Hemixos flavala
Mountain bulbul, Ixos mcclellandii
Streaked bulbul, Ixos malaccensis

Leaf warblersOrder: PasseriformesFamily: Phylloscopidae

Leaf warblers are a family of small insectivorous birds found mostly in Eurasia and ranging into Wallacea and Africa. The species are of various sizes, often green-plumaged above and yellow below, or more subdued with greyish-green to greyish-brown colours.

Ashy-throated warbler, Phylloscopus maculipennis
Buff-barred warbler, Phylloscopus pulcher
Yellow-browed warbler, Phylloscopus inornatus
Hume's warbler, Phylloscopus humei
Chinese leaf warbler, Phylloscopus yunnanensis
Pallas's leaf warbler, Phylloscopus proregulus
Lemon-rumped warbler, Phylloscopus chloronotus
Sichuan leaf warbler, Phylloscopus forresti
Tytler's leaf warbler, Phylloscopus tytleri
Radde's warbler, Phylloscopus schwarzi
Yellow-streaked warbler, Phylloscopus armandii
Tickell's leaf warbler, Phylloscopus affinis
Dusky warbler, Phylloscopus fuscatus
Smoky warbler, Phylloscopus fuligiventer
Buff-throated warbler, Phylloscopus subaffinis
Common chiffchaff, Phylloscopus collybita (A)
Eastern crowned warbler, Phylloscopus coronatus
White-spectacled warbler, Phylloscopus affinis
Gray-cheeked warbler, Phylloscopus poliogenys
Green-crowned warbler, Phylloscopus burkii
Gray-crowned warbler, Phylloscopus tephrocephalus
Whistler's warbler, Phylloscopus whistleri
Bianchi's warbler, Phylloscopus valentini
Martens's warbler, Phylloscopus omeiensis
Alström's warbler, Phylloscopus soror
Greenish warbler, Phylloscopus trochiloides
Two-barred warbler, Phylloscopus plumbeitarsus
Large-billed leaf warbler, Phylloscopus magnirostris
Pale-legged leaf warbler, Phylloscopus tenellipes
Sakhalin leaf warbler, Phylloscopus borealoides
Arctic warbler, Phylloscopus borealis
Chestnut-crowned warbler, Phylloscopus castaniceps
Yellow-vented warbler, Phylloscopus cantator
Sulphur-breasted warbler, Phylloscopus ricketti
Blyth's leaf warbler, Phylloscopus reguloides
Claudia's leaf warbler, Phylloscopus claudiae
Gray-hooded warbler, Phylloscopus xanthoschistos
Davison's leaf warbler, Phylloscopus intensior
Kloss's leaf warbler, Phylloscopus ogilviegranti

Bush warblers and alliesOrder: PasseriformesFamily: Scotocercidae

The members of this family are found throughout Africa, Asia, and Polynesia. Their taxonomy is in flux, and some authorities place some genera in other families.

Pale-footed bush warbler, Urosphena pallidipes
Asian stubtail, Urosphena squameiceps
Gray-bellied tesia, Tesia cyaniventer
Slaty-bellied tesia, Tesia olivea
Chestnut-crowned bush warbler, Cettia major
Gray-sided bush warbler, Cettia brunnifrons
Chestnut-headed tesia, Cettia castaneocoronata
Yellow-bellied warbler, Abroscopus superciliaris
Rufous-faced warbler, Abroscopus albogularis
Black-faced warbler, Abroscopus schisticeps
Mountain tailorbird, Phyllergates cuculatus
Broad-billed warbler, Tickellia hodgsoni
Brownish-flanked bush warbler, Horornis fortipes
Hume's bush warbler, Horornis brunnescens
Yellowish-bellied bush warbler, Horornis acanthizoides
Aberrant bush warbler, Horornis flavolivaceus

Long-tailed titsOrder: PasseriformesFamily: Aegithalidae

Long-tailed tits are a group of small passerine birds with medium to long tails. They make woven bag nests in trees. Most eat a mixed diet which includes insects. 

Black-throated tit, Aegithalos concinnus
Black-browed tit, Aegithalos iouschistos

Sylviid warblers, parrotbills, and alliesOrder: PasseriformesFamily: Sylviidae

The family Sylviidae is a group of small insectivorous passerine birds. They mainly occur as breeding species, as the common name implies, in Europe, Asia and, to a lesser extent, Africa. Most are of generally undistinguished appearance, but many have distinctive songs.

Fire-tailed myzornis, Myzornis pyrrhoura
Golden-breasted fulvetta, Lioparus chrysotis
Yellow-eyed babbler, Chrysomma sinense
Jerdon's babbler, Chrysomma altirostre
Brown-throated fulvetta, Fulvetta ludlowi
White-browed fulvetta, Fulvetta vinipectus
Streak-throated fulvetta, Fulvetta manipurensis
Great parrotbill, Conostoma aemodium
Brown parrotbill, Cholornis unicolor
Gray-headed parrotbill, Psittiparus gularis
Rufous-headed parrotbill, Psittiparus bakeri
Black-breasted parrotbill, Paradoxornis flavirostris
Spot-breasted parrotbill, Paradoxornis guttaticollis
Pale-billed parrotbill, Chleuasicus atrosuperciliaris
Vinous-throated parrotbill, Sinosuthora webbiana
Brown-winged parrotbill, Sinosuthora brunnea
Fulvous parrotbill, Suthora fulvifrons
Black-throated parrotbill, Suthora nipalensis
Golden parrotbill, Suthora verreauxi
Short-tailed parrotbill, Neosuthora davidiana

White-eyes, yuhinas, and alliesOrder: PasseriformesFamily: Zosteropidae

The white-eyes are small and mostly undistinguished, their plumage above being generally some dull colour like greenish-olive, but some species have a white or bright yellow throat, breast or lower parts, and several have buff flanks. As their name suggests, many species have a white ring around each eye.

White-collared yuhina, Parayuhina diademata
Striated yuhina, Staphida castaniceps
Indochinese yuhina, Staphida torqueola
White-naped yuhina, Yuhina bakeri
Whiskered yuhina, Yuhina flavicollis
Burmese yuhina, Yuhina humilis
Stripe-throated yuhina, Yuhina gularis
Rufous-vented yuhina, Yuhina occipitalis
Black-chinned yuhina, Yuhina nigrimenta
Chestnut-flanked white-eye, Zosterops erythropleurus
Indian white-eye, Zosterops palpebrosus
Hume's white-eye, Zosterops auriventer
Swinhoe's white-eye, Zosterops simplex

Tree-babblers, scimitar-babblers, and alliesOrder: PasseriformesFamily: Timaliidae

The babblers, or timaliids, are somewhat diverse in size and colouration, but are characterised by soft fluffy plumage.

Chestnut-capped babbler, Timalia pileata
Pin-striped tit-babbler, Mixornis gularis
Golden babbler, Cyanoderma chrysaeum
Chestnut-winged babbler, Cyanoderma erythropterum
Rufous-capped babbler, Cyanoderma ruficeps
Buff-chested babbler, Cyanoderma ambiguum
Rufous-fronted babbler, Cyanoderma rufifrons
Bar-winged wren-babbler, Spelaeornis troglodytoides
Chin Hills wren-babbler, Spelaeornis oatesi
Gray-bellied wren-babbler, Spelaeornis reptatus
Red-billed scimitar-babbler, Pomatorhinus ochraceiceps
Coral-billed scimitar-babbler, Pomatorhinus ferruginosus
Slender-billed scimitar-babbler, Pomatorhinus superciliaris
Streak-breasted scimitar-babbler, Pomatorhinus ruficollis
White-browed scimitar-babbler, Pomatorhinus schisticeps
Large scimitar babbler, Megapomatorhinus hypoleucos
Rusty-cheeked scimitar babbler, Megapomatorhinus erythrogenys
Spot-breasted scimitar babbler, Megapomatorhinus mcclellandi
Black-streaked scimitar babbler, Megapomatorhinus gravivox
Gray-throated babbler, Stachyris nigriceps
Snowy-throated babbler, Stachyris oglei
Spot-necked babbler, Stachyris striolata
Cachar wedge-billed babbler, Stachyris roberti

Ground babblers and alliesOrder: PasseriformesFamily: Pellorneidae

These small to medium-sized songbirds have soft fluffy plumage but are otherwise rather diverse. Members of the genus Illadopsis are found in forests, but some other genera are birds of scrublands.

Moustached babbler, Malacopteron magnirostre
Rufous-crowned babbler, Malacopteron magnum
White-hooded babbler, Gampsorhynchus rufulus
Collared babbler, Gampsorhynchus torquatus
Yellow-throated fulvetta, Schoeniparus cinereus
Rufous-winged fulvetta, Schoeniparus castaneceps
Rufous-throated fulvetta, Schoeniparus rufogularis
Dusky fulvetta, Schoeniparus brunneus
Rusty-capped fulvetta, Schoeniparus dubius (E)
Puff-throated babbler, Pellorneum ruficeps
Black-capped babbler, Pellorneum capistratum
Spot-throated babbler, Pellorneum albiventre
Buff-breasted babbler, Pellorneum tickelli
Short-tailed babbler, Pellorneum malaccense
White-chested babbler, Pellorneum rostratum
Ferruginous babbler, Pellorneum bicolor
Eyebrowed wren-babbler, Napothera epilepidota
Naung Mung scimitar-babbler, Napothera naungmungensis (E)
Long-billed wren-babbler, Napothera malacoptila
Abbott's babbler, Malacocincla abbotti
Variable limestone babbler, 	Gypsophila crispifrons
Streaked wren-babbler, Gypsophila brevicaudatus
Indian grassbird, Graminicola bengalensis
Chinese grassbird, Graminicola striatus

Laughingthrushes and alliesOrder: PasseriformesFamily: Leiothrichidae

The members of this family are diverse in size and colouration, though those of genus Turdoides tend to be brown or greyish. The family is found in Africa, India, and southeast Asia.

Brown-cheeked fulvetta, Alcippe poioicephala
Yunnan fulvetta, Alcippe fratercula
Nepal fulvetta, Alcippe nipalensis
Striated laughingthrush, Grammatoptila striata
Himalayan cutia, Cutia nipalensis
Striated babbler, Argya earlei
White-throated babbler, Argya gularis (E)
Slender-billed babbler, Argya longirostris
White-crested laughingthrush, Garrulax leucolophus
Lesser necklaced laughingthrush, Garrulax monileger
White-necked laughingthrush, Garrulax strepitans
Spot-breasted laughingthrush, Garrulax merulinus
Moustached laughingthrush, Ianthocincla cineracea
Rufous-chinned laughingthrush, Ianthocincla rufogularis
Spotted laughingthrush, Ianthocincla ocellata
Greater necklaced laughingthrush, Pterorhinus pectoralis
White-throated laughingthrush, Pterorhinus albogularis (A)
Rufous-necked laughingthrush, Pterorhinus ruficollis
Chestnut-backed laughingthrush, Pterorhinus nuchalis
Black-throated laughingthrush, Pterorhinus chinensis
Yellow-throated laughingthrush, Pterorhinus galbanus
Rufous-vented laughingthrush, Pterorhinus gularis
Gray-sided laughingthrush, Pterorhinus caerulatus
White-browed laughingthrush, Pterorhinus sannio
Chinese babax, Pterorhinus lanceolatus
Mount Victoria babax, Pterorhinus woodi
Striped laughingthrush, Trochalopteron virgatus
Scaly laughingthrush, Trochalopteron subunicolor
Brown-capped laughingthrush, Trochalopteron austeni
Blue-winged laughingthrush, Trochalopteron squamatum
Black-faced laughingthrush, Trochalopteron affine
Chestnut-crowned laughingthrush, Trochalopteron erythrocephalum
Assam laughingthrush, Trochalopteron chrysopterum
Silver-eared laughingthrush, Trochalopteron melanostigma
Red-tailed laughingthrush, Trochalopteron milnei
Gray sibia, Heterophasia gracilis
Black-backed sibia, Heterophasia melanoleuca
Black-headed sibia, Heterophasia desgodinsi
Beautiful sibia, Heterophasia pulchella
Long-tailed sibia, Heterophasia picaoides
Silver-eared mesia, Leiothrix argentauris
Red-billed leiothrix, Leiothrix lutea
Red-tailed minla, Minla ignotincta
Rufous-backed sibia, Leioptila annectens
Red-faced liocichla, Liocichla phoenicea
Scarlet-faced liocichla, Liocichla ripponi
Hoary-throated barwing, Actinodura nipalensis
Streak-throated barwing, Actinodura waldeni
Rusty-fronted barwing, Actinodura egertoni
Spectacled barwing, Actinodura ramsayi
Blue-winged minla, Actinodura cyanouroptera
Chestnut-tailed minla, Actinodura strigula

KingletsOrder: PasseriformesFamily: Regulidae

The kinglets, also called crests, are a small group of birds often included in the Old World warblers, but frequently given family status because they also resemble the titmice. 

Goldcrest, Regulus regulus

NuthatchesOrder: PasseriformesFamily: Sittidae

Nuthatches are small woodland birds. They have the unusual ability to climb down trees head first, unlike other birds which can only go upwards. Nuthatches have big heads, short tails and powerful bills and feet.

Chestnut-bellied nuthatch, Sitta castanea
Burmese nuthatch, Sitta neglecta
Chestnut-vented nuthatch, Sitta nagaensis
White-tailed nuthatch, Sitta himalayensis
White-browed nuthatch, Sitta victoriae (E)
Velvet-fronted nuthatch, Sitta frontalis
Giant nuthatch, Sitta magna
Beautiful nuthatch, Sitta formosa

TreecreepersOrder: PasseriformesFamily: Certhiidae

Treecreepers are small woodland birds, brown above and white below. They have thin pointed down-curved bills, which they use to extricate insects from bark. They have stiff tail feathers, like woodpeckers, which they use to support themselves on vertical trees.

Hodgson's treecreeper, Certhia hodgsoni
Bar-tailed treecreeper, Certhia himalayana
Rusty-flanked treecreeper, Certhia nipalensis
Hume's treecreeper, Certhia manipurensis

WrensOrder: PasseriformesFamily: Troglodytidae

The wrens are mainly small and inconspicuous except for their loud songs. These birds have short wings and thin down-turned bills. Several species often hold their tails upright. All are insectivorous.

Eurasian wren, Troglodytes troglodytes

Spotted elachuraOrder: PasseriformesFamily: Elachuridae

This species, the only one in its family, inhabits forest undergrowth throughout South East Asia.

Spotted elachura, Elachura formosa

DippersOrder: PasseriformesFamily: Cinclidae

Dippers are a group of perching birds whose habitat includes aquatic environments in the Americas, Europe and Asia. They are named for their bobbing or dipping movements. 

White-throated dipper, Cinclus cinclus
Brown dipper, Cinclus pallasii

StarlingsOrder: PasseriformesFamily: Sturnidae

Starlings are small to medium-sized passerine birds. Their flight is strong and direct and they are very gregarious. Their preferred habitat is fairly open country. They eat insects and fruit. Plumage is typically dark with a metallic sheen.

Asian glossy starling, Aplonis panayensis
Golden-crested myna, Ampeliceps coronatus
Common hill myna, Gracula religiosa
European starling, Sturnus vulgaris
Rosy starling, Pastor roseus (A)
Daurian starling, Agropsar sturninus
Black-collared starling, Gracupica nigricollis
Indian pied starling, Gracupica contra
Siamese pied starling, Gracupica floweri
White-shouldered starling, Sturnia sinensis (A)
Brahminy starling, Sturnia pagodarum (A)
Chestnut-tailed starling, Sturnia malabarica
White-cheeked starling, Spodiopsar cineraceus
Common myna, Acridotheres tristis
Burmese myna, Acridotheres burmannicus
Jungle myna, Acridotheres fuscus
Javan myna, Acridotheres javanicus (I)
Collared myna, Acridotheres albocinctus
Great myna, Acridotheres grandis
Crested myna, Acridotheres cristatellus
Spot-winged starling, Saroglossa spilopterus

Thrushes and alliesOrder: PasseriformesFamily: Turdidae

The thrushes are a group of passerine birds that occur mainly in the Old World. They are plump, soft plumaged, small to medium-sized insectivores or sometimes omnivores, often feeding on the ground. Many have attractive songs.

Grandala, Grandala coelicolor
Long-tailed thrush, Zoothera dixoni
Alpine thrush, Zoothera mollissima
Himalayan thrush, Zoothera salimalii
Dark-sided thrush, Zoothera marginata
Long-billed thrush, Zoothera monticola
White's thrush, Zoothera aurea (A)
Scaly thrush, Zoothera dauma
Purple cochoa, Cochoa purpurea
Green cochoa, Cochoa viridis
Siberian thrush, Geokichla sibirica
Orange-headed thrush, Geokichla citrina
Song thrush, Turdus philomelos (A)
Chinese blackbird, Turdus mandarinus
Gray-winged blackbird, Turdus boulboul
Japanese thrush, Turdus cardis (A)
Black-breasted thrush, Turdus dissimilis
Gray-sided thrush, Turdus feae
Eyebrowed thrush, Turdus obscurus
White-collared blackbird, Turdus albocinctus
Chestnut thrush, Turdus rubrocanus
Black-throated thrush, Turdus atrogularis
Red-throated thrush, Turdus ruficollis
Dusky thrush, Turdus eunomus

Old World flycatchersOrder: PasseriformesFamily''': Muscicapidae

Old World flycatchers are a large group of small passerine birds native to the Old World. They are mainly small arboreal insectivores. The appearance of these birds is highly varied, but they mostly have weak songs and harsh calls.

Dark-sided flycatcher, Muscicapa sibiricaFerruginous flycatcher, Muscicapa ferrugineaAsian brown flycatcher, Muscicapa dauuricaBrown-breasted flycatcher, Muscicapa muttuiBrown-streaked flycatcher, Muscicapa williamsoniOriental magpie-robin, Copsychus saularisWhite-rumped shama, Copsychus malabaricusWhite-gorgeted flycatcher, Anthipes monilegerRufous-browed flycatcher, Anthipes solitarisWhite-tailed flycatcher, Cyornis concretusHainan blue flycatcher, Cyornis hainanusPale-chinned blue flycatcher, Cyornis poliogenysPale blue flycatcher, Cyornis unicolorBlue-throated flycatcher, Cyornis rubeculoidesChinese blue flycatcher, Cyornis glaucicomansLarge blue flycatcher, Cyornis magnirostrisHill blue flycatcher, Cyornis whiteiTickell's blue flycatcher, Cyornis tickelliaeIndochinese blue flycatcher, Cyornis sumatrensisGray-chested jungle-flycatcher, Cyornis umbratilis (A)
Fulvous-chested jungle-flycatcher, Cyornis olivaceusLarge niltava, Niltava grandisSmall niltava, Niltava macgrigoriaeRufous-bellied niltava, Niltava sundaraVivid niltava, Niltava vividaBlue-and-white flycatcher, Cyanoptila cyanomelanaZappey's flycatcher, Cyanoptila cumatilisVerditer flycatcher, Eumyias thalassinaRusty-bellied shortwing, Brachypteryx hyperythraGould's shortwing, Brachypteryx stellataLesser shortwing, Brachypteryx leucophrysHimalayan shortwing, Brachypteryx cruralis'
Indian blue robin, Larvivora brunnea
Siberian blue robin, Larvivora cyane
White-bellied redstart, Luscinia phaenicuroides
Bluethroat, Luscinia svecica
Blue whistling-thrush, Myophonus caeruleus
Little forktail, Enicurus scouleri
White-crowned forktail, Enicurus leschenaulti
Spotted forktail, Enicurus maculatus
Chestnut-naped forktail, Enicurus ruficapillus
Black-backed forktail, Enicurus immaculatus
Slaty-backed forktail, Enicurus schistaceus
Firethroat, Calliope pectardens
Blackthroat, Calliope obscura
Siberian rubythroat, Calliope calliope
Himalayan rubythroat, Calliope pectoralis
Chinese rubythroat, Calliope tschebaiewi
White-tailed robin, Myiomela leucura
Red-flanked bluetail, Tarsiger cyanurus
Himalayan bluetail, Tarsiger rufilatus
Rufous-breasted bush-robin, Tarsiger hyperythrus
White-browed bush-robin, Tarsiger indicus
Golden bush-robin, Tarsiger chrysaeus
Yellow-rumped flycatcher, Ficedula zanthopygia
Green-backed flycatcher, Ficedula elisae
Mugimaki flycatcher, Ficedula mugimaki
Slaty-backed flycatcher, Ficedula hodgsonii
Slaty-blue flycatcher, Ficedula tricolor
Snowy-browed flycatcher, Ficedula hyperythra
Pygmy flycatcher, Ficedula hodgsoni
Rufous-gorgeted flycatcher, Ficedula strophiata
Sapphire flycatcher, Ficedula sapphira
Little pied flycatcher, Ficedula westermanni
Ultramarine flycatcher, Ficedula superciliaris
Taiga flycatcher, Ficedula albicilla
Red-breasted flycatcher, Ficedula parva (A)
Blue-fronted redstart, Phoenicurus frontalis
Plumbeous redstart, Phoenicurus fuliginosus
White-capped redstart, Phoenicurus leucocephalus
Hodgson's redstart, Phoenicurus hodgsoni
White-throated redstart, Phoenicurus schisticeps
Black redstart, Phoenicurus ochruros
Daurian redstart, Phoenicurus auroreus
Chestnut-bellied rock-thrush, Monticola rufiventris
White-throated rock-thrush, Monticola gularis
Blue-capped rock-thrush, Monticola cinclorhyncha
Blue rock-thrush, Monticola solitarius
Siberian stonechat, Saxicola maurus
Amur stonechat, Saxicola stejnegeri
White-tailed stonechat, Saxicola leucurus
Pied bushchat, Saxicola caprata
Jerdon's bushchat, Saxicola jerdoni
Gray bushchat, Saxicola ferreus

FlowerpeckersOrder: PasseriformesFamily: Dicaeidae

The flowerpeckers are very small, stout, often brightly coloured birds, with short tails, short thick curved bills and tubular tongues.

Yellow-breasted flowerpecker, Prionochilus maculatus
Thick-billed flowerpecker, Dicaeum agile
Yellow-vented flowerpecker, Dicaeum chrysorrheum
Yellow-bellied flowerpecker, Dicaeum melanozanthum
Orange-bellied flowerpecker, Dicaeum trigonostigma
Pale-billed flowerpecker, Dicaeum erythrorhynchos
Plain flowerpecker, Dicaeum minullum
Fire-breasted flowerpecker, Dicaeum ignipectus
Scarlet-backed flowerpecker, Dicaeum cruentatum

Sunbirds and spiderhuntersOrder: PasseriformesFamily: Nectariniidae

The sunbirds and spiderhunters are very small passerine birds which feed largely on nectar, although they will also take insects, especially when feeding young. Flight is fast and direct on their short wings. Most species can take nectar by hovering like a hummingbird, but usually perch to feed.

Ruby-cheeked sunbird, Chalcoparia singalensis
Plain sunbird, Anthreptes simplex
Brown-throated sunbird, Anthreptes malacensis
Red-throated sunbird, Anthreptes rhodolaema
Purple-rumped sunbird, Leptocoma zeylonica
Van Hasselt's sunbird, Leptocoma brasiliana
Copper-throated sunbird, Leptocoma calcostetha
Purple sunbird, Cinnyris asiaticus
Olive-backed sunbird, Cinnyris jugularis
Fire-tailed sunbird, Aethopyga ignicauda
Black-throated sunbird, Aethopyga saturata
Mrs. Gould's sunbird, Aethopyga gouldiae
Green-tailed sunbird, Aethopyga nipalensis
Crimson sunbird, Aethopyga siparaja
Purple-naped spiderhunter, Kurochkinegramma hypogrammicum
Long-billed spiderhunter, Arachnothera robusta
Little spiderhunter, Arachnothera longirostra
Yellow-eared spiderhunter, Arachnothera chrysogenys
Spectacled spiderhunter, Arachnothera flavigaster (A)
Streaked spiderhunter, Arachnothera magna
Gray-breasted spiderhunter, Arachnothera modesta

Fairy-bluebirdsOrder: PasseriformesFamily: Irenidae

The fairy-bluebirds are bulbul-like birds of open forest or thorn scrub. The males are dark-blue and the females a duller green. 

Asian fairy-bluebird, Irena puella

LeafbirdsOrder: PasseriformesFamily: Chloropseidae

The leafbirds are small, bulbul-like birds. The males are brightly plumaged, usually in greens and yellows.

Greater green leafbird, Chloropsis sonnerati
Lesser green leafbird, Chloropsis cyanopogon
Blue-winged leafbird, Chloropsis cochinchinensis
Golden-fronted leafbird, Chloropsis aurifrons
Orange-bellied leafbird, Chloropsis hardwickii

Weavers and alliesOrder: PasseriformesFamily: Ploceidae

The weavers are small passerine birds related to the finches. They are seed-eating birds with rounded conical bills. The males of many species are brightly coloured, usually in red or yellow and black, some species show variation in colour only in the breeding season. 

Streaked weaver, Ploceus manyar
Baya weaver, Ploceus philippinus
Asian golden weaver, Ploceus hypoxanthus

Waxbills and alliesOrder: PasseriformesFamily: Estrildidae

The estrildid finches are small passerine birds of the Old World tropics and Australasia. They are gregarious and often colonial seed eaters with short thick but pointed bills. They are all similar in structure and habits, but have wide variation in plumage colours and patterns.

Red avadavat, Amandava amandava
Pin-tailed parrotfinch, Erythrura prasina
White-rumped munia, Lonchura striata
Scaly-breasted munia, Lonchura punctulata
White-bellied munia, Lonchura leucogastra
Chestnut munia, Lonchura atricapilla
White-headed munia, Lonchura maja
Java sparrow, Padda oryzivora (I)

AccentorsOrder: PasseriformesFamily: Prunellidae

The accentors are in the only bird family, Prunellidae, which is completely endemic to the Palearctic. They are small, fairly drab species superficially similar to sparrows.

Alpine accentor, Prunella collaris
Rufous-breasted accentor, Prunella strophiata
Maroon-backed accentor, Prunella immaculata

Old World sparrowsOrder: PasseriformesFamily: Passeridae

Old World sparrows are small passerine birds. In general, sparrows tend to be small, plump, brown or grey birds with short tails and short powerful beaks. Sparrows are seed eaters, but they also consume small insects. 

House sparrow, Passer domesticus
Russet sparrow, Passer cinnamomeus
Plain-backed sparrow, Passer flaveolus
Eurasian tree sparrow, Passer montanus

Wagtails and pipitsOrder: PasseriformesFamily: Motacillidae

Motacillidae is a family of small passerine birds with medium to long tails. They include the wagtails, longclaws and pipits. They are slender, ground feeding insectivores of open country.

Forest wagtail, Dendronanthus indicus
Gray wagtail, Motacilla cinerea
Western yellow wagtail, Motacilla flava
Eastern yellow wagtail, Motacilla tschutschensis
Citrine wagtail, Motacilla citreola
White wagtail, Motacilla alba
Richard's pipit, Anthus richardi
Paddyfield pipit, Anthus rufulus
Long-billed pipit, Anthus similis
Blyth's pipit, Anthus godlewskii
Upland pipit, Anthus sylvanus (A)
Rosy pipit, Anthus roseatus
Tree pipit, Anthus trivialis (A)
Olive-backed pipit, Anthus hodgsoni
Red-throated pipit, Anthus cervinus
American pipit, Anthus rubescens (A)

Finches, euphonias, and alliesOrder: PasseriformesFamily: Fringillidae

Finches are seed-eating passerine birds, that are small to moderately large and have a strong beak, usually conical and in some species very large. All have twelve tail feathers and nine primaries. These birds have a bouncing flight with alternating bouts of flapping and gliding on closed wings, and most sing well.

Brambling, Fringilla montifringilla (A)
Collared grosbeak, Mycerobas affinis
Spot-winged grosbeak, Mycerobas melanozanthos
White-winged grosbeak, Mycerobas carnipes
Yellow-billed grosbeak, Eophona migratoria (A)
Common rosefinch, Carpodacus erythrinus
Scarlet finch, Carpodacus sipahi
Dark-rumped rosefinch, Carpodacus edwardsii
Sharpe's rosefinch, Carpodacus verreauxii
Vinaceous rosefinch, Carpodacus vinaceus
Red-fronted rosefinch, Carpodacus puniceus (A)
Crimson-browed finch, Carpodacus subhimachalus
Brown bullfinch, Pyrrhula nipalensis
Gray-headed bullfinch, Pyrrhula erythaca
Gold-naped finch, Pyrrhoplectes epauletta
Dark-breasted rosefinch, Procarduelis nipalensis
Plain mountain finch, Leucosticte nemoricola
Black-headed mountain finch, Leucosticte brandti (A)
Yellow-breasted greenfinch, Chloris spinoides
Black-headed greenfinch, Chloris ambigua
Red crossbill, Loxia curvirostra
Tibetan serin, Spinus thibetanus

Old World buntingsOrder: PasseriformesFamily': Emberizidae

The emberizids are a large family of passerine birds. They are seed-eating birds with distinctively shaped bills. Many emberizid species have distinctive head patterns.

Crested bunting, Emberiza lathamiBlack-headed bunting, Emberiza melanocephala (A)
Chestnut-eared bunting, Emberiza fucataRock bunting, Emberiza ciaGodlewski's bunting, Emberiza godlewskiiYellow-throated bunting, Emberiza elegansReed bunting, Emberiza schoeniclus (A)
Yellow-breasted bunting, Emberiza aureolaLittle bunting, Emberiza pusillaBlack-faced bunting, Emberiza spodocephalaChestnut bunting, Emberiza rutilaTristram's bunting, Emberiza tristrami'' (A)

See also
List of birds
Lists of birds by region

Notes

References

Myanmar
Myanmar
'
birds